State Route 237 (SR 237) is a  route that serves as a connection between SR 172 east of Hackleburg with SR 13 in Phil Campbell.

Route description
The southern terminus of SR 237 is located at its intersection with SR 172 east of Hackleburg. From this point, the route travels in a northeasterly direction to its northern terminus at its intersection with SR 13 in Phil Campbell.

Major intersections

References

237
Transportation in Marion County, Alabama
Transportation in Franklin County, Alabama